Oru Nokku Kanan is an  Indian Malayalam film,  directed by  Sajan and produced by P. T. Xavier in 1985. The film stars Mammootty, Ambika, Shalini and Shankar. The film has musical score by Shyam.

Plot 

Maya, a labour officer sees her ex-lover, Jayadevan who ditched her. She bore a child with him. Jayadevan from unfortunate circumstances wasn't able to get in touch with Maya and didn't know they had a child together from their relationship. Years later, they are neighbors, Jayadevan is a widowed factory owner, Maya is a labour officer who has to conduct regular inspections at the factory as a part of her work. They both are single parents with a child that looks alike. The film explores whether Maya and Jayadevan be able to rekindle their love.

Cast
Mammootty as Jayadevan
Ambika as Maya
Shalini as Chinnukkutti / Unnimol
Shankar as Shankar
Menaka as Sandhya
Sukumari as Vilasini
Lalu Alex as Gopan
Mala Aravindan as Vidyadharan
Innocent as Innochen
V. D. Rajappan as Kunjandi
Adoor Bhavani as Kathreena

Release
The film was released on 1985.

Critical Reception
The film received rave reviews from the audience. The film's success was mainly due to Mammootty - Shalini (Baby Shalini at that time) combo. Both the songs also received wide appreciation.

Box office
The film was both commercial and critical success and it earned a cult status.

Soundtrack

References

External links
 

1985 films
1980s Malayalam-language films
Films directed by Sajan